X class or Class X may refer to:

Automobiles
 Mercedes-Benz X-Class, a luxury pickup truck

Railway locomotives
 TGR X class, a class of diesel-electric locomotives used by the Tasmanian Government Railways
 NZR X class, a class of steam locomotives used by the New Zealand Railways Department
 South Australian Railways X class, a class of steam locomotives used by the South Australian Railways
 Victorian Railways X class, a class of steam locomotives used by the Victorian Railways in Australia
 Victorian Railways X class (diesel), a class of diesel locomotives used by the Victorian Railways in Australia
 WAGR X class, a class of diesel locomotives used in Western Australia
 NCC Class X, a class of steam locomotives used in Northern Ireland
 NER Class X, a class of steam locomotives used on the North Eastern Railway of Britain
 Nilgiri Mountain Railway X class, a class of rack and pinion steam locomotives used in India

Ships
 X-class submarine, a  British midget submarine
 X-class lifeboat, operated by the RNLI

Model yachts
 San Francisco Model Yacht Club X Class, a model yacht class

Drones 
 X Class drone racing, which is a name used for first-person view (radio control) giant drone racing

Other uses 
 Tenth grade, Class X, secondary education in countries such as India and Indonesia.
 X is the class of solar flares with the highest peak soft X-ray flux

See also
 Class 10 (disambiguation)